Raymundo Izcoa (15 March 1891 – 7 May 1970) was a Mexican fencer. He competed in the individual and team foil events at the 1932 Summer Olympics.

References

External links
 

1891 births
1970 deaths
Mexican male foil fencers
Olympic fencers of Mexico
Fencers at the 1932 Summer Olympics
Fencers from Mexico City
20th-century Mexican people